Sri Jayarajacudamani (12th-century), was a princess and queen consort of the Khmer Empire, married to Dharanindravarman II of the Khmer Empire (r. 1150–1160).

She was the daughter of Harshavarman III.

She married before 1125. She best known for being the mother of Jayavarman VII, who was born in circa 1125.

Her spouse became king in 1150, and she became queen.

An inscription described Queen Jayarajadevi after her husband went into exile:
"[her] asceticism, her virtuous conduct, her tears, her likeness to Sita, found by her husband and then separated from him, her body thinned by observances, her religion, her devotion to him, her joy at this ultimate return."

References

External links
 History of Jayavarman VII

Cambodian queens
Cambodian Hindus
Khmer Empire
12th-century Cambodian women